was one of twelve s, built for the Imperial Japanese Navy (IJN) during the 1920s. Retreating after the sinking of destroyer  by American coast-defense guns during the Battle of Wake Island in December 1941, Kisaragi was sunk with all hands by American aircraft. She had the distinction of being the second major Japanese warship lost during the war (after Hayate earlier the same day).
She should not be confused with an earlier World War I-period  destroyer with the same name.

Design and description
The Mutsuki class was an improved version of the s and was the first with triple  torpedo tubes. They were powered by two Parsons geared steam turbines, each driving one propeller shaft, using steam provided by four Kampon water-tube boilers. Their crew consisted of 150 officers and crewmen.

The main armament of the Mutsuki-class ships consisted of four  Type 3 guns in single mounts; one gun forward of the superstructure, one between the two funnels and the last pair back to back atop the aft superstructure. The guns were numbered '1' to '4' from front to rear. The ships carried two above-water triple sets of 61-centimeter torpedo tubes; one mount was between the forward superstructure and the forward gun and the other was between the aft funnel and aft superstructure. Four reload torpedoes were provided for the tubes. They carried 18 depth charges and could also carry 16 mines. They could also fitted with minesweeping gear.

Construction and career
Kisaragi was laid down at the Maizuru Naval Arsenal on 3 June 1922, launched on 5 June 1925 and completed on 21 December 1925. Originally commissioned simply as Destroyer No. 21, the vessel was assigned the name Kisaragi on 1 August 1928.

Pacific War
At the time of the attack on Pearl Harbor on 7 December 1941, Kisaragi was assigned to Destroyer Division 30 under Destroyer Squadron 6 of the 4th Fleet. She sortied from Kwajalein on 8 December as part of the Wake Island invasion force.

As none of the six American  coast-defense guns replied, Rear Admiral Sadamichi Kajioka, commander of the invasion forces, ordered his ships to close the island, believing that the American guns had been destroyed by the earlier aerial attacks. Encouraging this, Major James Devereux, commander of the United States Marine garrison, had ordered his men to hold their fire until he gave the order to do so. They did so with great effect, sinking Hayate, near-missing Kajioka's flagship Yubari, and causing to him to order his forces to disengage.

Kisaragi was sailing away from the island when she was attacked and sunk by Grumman F4F Wildcat fighters of Marine Fighter Squadron VMF-211 that had taken off earlier armed with  bombs. What happened next is unclear as sources disagree: older American accounts attribute her loss to a bomb dropped by Captain Henry Elrod that landed amongst her depth charges on Kisaragis stern, which detonated and sank the destroyer; a more recent account says that Elrod dropped a bomb that penetrated belowdecks and started a fire and that she blew up later just as another pilot was preparing to attack. Japanese accounts say that one bomb demolished the ship's bridge and that she blew up five minutes later, with the blast originating from amidships. Kisaragi was struck from the Navy List on 15 January 1942. The sinking of Kisaragi would contribute to Elrod being posthumously awarded the Medal of Honor.

Notes

Sources

External links
Mutsuki-class destroyers on Materials of the Imperial Japanese Navy

Mutsuki-class destroyers
Ships built by Maizuru Naval Arsenal
1925 ships
World War II destroyers of Japan
Destroyers sunk by aircraft
Ships sunk by US aircraft
World War II shipwrecks in the Pacific Ocean
Battle of Wake Island
Ships lost with all hands
Maritime incidents in December 1941
Naval magazine explosions